Walter de Paula (5 March 1916 – 31 May 1998) was a Brazilian épée fencer. He competed at the 1948 and 1952 Summer Olympics.

References

External links
 

1916 births
1998 deaths
Brazilian male épée fencers
Olympic fencers of Brazil
Fencers at the 1948 Summer Olympics
Fencers at the 1952 Summer Olympics
20th-century Brazilian people